Cratoptera is a genus of moths in the family Geometridae. Their faunal composition can proportionally increase in change with geographical altitude.

Species
 Cratoptera apicata Warren, 1894
 Cratoptera vestianaria Herrich-Schäffer, [1855]

References

 Cratoptera at Markku Savela's Lepidoptera and Some Other Life Forms
 Natural History Museum Lepidoptera genus database

Ennominae